Dadabhai Naoroji (4 September 1825 – 30 June 1917) also known as the "Grand Old Man of India" and "Unofficial Ambassador of India", was an Indian political leader, merchant, scholar and writer who served as 2nd, 9th, and 22nd President of the Indian National Congress from 1886 to 1887, 1893 to 1894 and 1906 to 1907. He was a Liberal Party Member of Parliament in the British House of Commons, representing Finsbury Central between 1892 and 1895. He was the second person of Asian descent to be a British MP, the first being Indian MP David Ochterlony Dyce Sombre, who was disenfranchised for corruption after nine months in office.

His book Poverty and Un-British Rule in India brought attention to his theory of the Indian "wealth drain" into Britain. He was also a member of the Second International along with Kautsky and Plekhanov. In 2014, Deputy Prime Minister Nick Clegg inaugurated the Dadabhai Naoroji Awards for services to UK-India relations. India Post depicted Naoroji on stamps in 1963, 1997 and 2017.

Biography
Naoroji was born in Navsari into a Gujarati-speaking Parsi Zoroastrian family, and educated at the Elphinstone Institute School. His patron was the Maharaja of Baroda, Sayajirao Gaekwad III, and he started his career life as Dewan (Minister) to the Maharaja in 1874. Being an Athornan (ordained priest), Naoroji founded the Rahnumai Mazdayasan Sabha (Guides on the Mazdayasne Path) on 1 August 1851 to restore the Zoroastrian religion to its original purity and simplicity. In 1854, he also founded a Gujarati fortnightly publication, the Rast Goftar (or The Truth Teller), to clarify Zoroastrian concepts and promote Parsi social reforms. 

Around this time, he also published another newspaper called The Voice of India. In December 1855, he was appointed Professor of Mathematics and Natural Philosophy in Elphinstone College in Bombay, becoming the first Indian to hold such an academic position. He travelled to London in 1855 to become a partner in Cama & Co, opening a Liverpool location for the first Indian company to be established in Britain. Within three years, he had resigned on ethical grounds. In 1859, he established his own cotton trading company, Dadabhai Naoroji & Co.

In 1861, Naoroji founded The Zoroastrian Trust Funds of Europe alongside Muncherjee Hormusji Cama.

In 1865, Naoroji directed and launched the London Indian Society, the purpose of which was to discuss Indian political, social and literary subjects. In 1867, he also helped to establish the East India Association, one of the predecessor organisations of the Indian National Congress with the aim of putting across the Indian point of view before the British public. The Association was instrumental in counter-acting the propaganda by the Ethnological Society of London which, in its session in 1866, had tried to prove the inferiority of the Asians to the Europeans. This Association soon won the support of eminent Englishmen and was able to exercise considerable influence in the British parliament. The organization soon had branches in Mumbai, Kolkata and Chennai.

In 1874, he became Prime Minister of Baroda and was a member of the Legislative Council of Bombay (1885–88). He was also a member of the Indian National Association founded by Sir Surendranath Banerjea from Calcutta a few years before the founding of the Indian National Congress in Bombay, with the same objectives and practices. The two groups later merged into the INC, and Naoroji was elected President of the Congress in 1886. Naoroji published Poverty and Un-British Rule in India in 1901.

Naoroji moved to Britain once again and continued his political involvement. Elected for the Liberal Party in Finsbury Central at the 1892 general election, he was the first British Indian MP. He refused to take the oath on the Bible, as he was Zoroastrian. He was allowed to take the oath of office in the name of God on his copy of the Khordeh Avesta. During his time he put his efforts towards improving the situation in India. He had a very clear vision and was an effective communicator. He set forth his views about the situation in India over the course of the history of the governance of the country and the way in which the colonial rulers rule. In Parliament, he spoke on Irish Home Rule and the condition of the Indian people. He was a notable Freemason.

In 1906, Naoroji was again elected president of the Indian National Congress. He was a staunch moderate within the Congress, during the phase when opinion in the party was split between the moderates and extremists. Such was the respect commanded by him that assertive nationalists could not oppose his candidature and the rift was avoided for the time being. Naoroji's Poverty and Un-British Rule in India influenced Mahatma Gandhi.

Personal life and death

He was married to Gulbai at the age of 11. He died in Bombay on 30 June 1917, at the age of 91. 

The Dadabhai Naoroji Road, a heritage road of Mumbai, is named after him, as are the Dadabhai Naoroji Road in Karachi, Pakistan and Naoroji Street in the Finsbury area of London. A prominent residential colony for central government servants in the south of Delhi is also named Naoroji Nagar. His granddaughters, Perin and Khurshedben, were also involved in the independence movement. In 1930, Khurshedben was arrested along with other revolutionaries for attempting to hoist the Indian flag in a Government College in Ahmedabad.

Drain theory and poverty
Naoroji's work focused on the drain of wealth from India to Britain during the period rule of British rule in India. One of the reasons that the Drain theory is attributed to Naoroji is his decision to estimate the net national profit of India, and by extension, the effect that colonial rule had on the country. Through his work with economics, Naoroji sought to prove that Britain was draining money out of India. Naoroji described six factors that resulted in the external drain. 

First, India was governed by a foreign government. Secondly, India did not attract immigrants who brought labour and capital for economic growth. Thirdly, India paid for Britain's civil administrations in India and her Indian army. Fourthly, India bore the burden of empire building in and out of its borders. Fifthly, opening the country to free trade allowed for foreigners to take highly paid jobs over those of equally qualified Indians. Lastly, the principal income-earners would spend their money outside of India or leave with the money as they were mostly foreign personnel.

His book Poverty and Un-British Rule in India estimated a 200–300 million pounds drain of India's revenue to Britain that was not recirculated into India.

When referring to the drain, Naoroji stated that he believed some tribute was necessary as payment for the services that Britain brought to India such as the newly-constructed railways. However the money from these services were being drained out of India; for instance the money being earned by the railways did not belong to India, which supported his assessment that India was sending too much to Britain. According to Naoroji, India was paying tribute for something that was not bringing profit to the country directly. Instead of paying off foreign investment, as other countries did, India was paying for services rendered despite the operation of the railway being already profitable for Britain. This type of drain was experienced in different ways as well, for instance, British workers earning wages that were not equal with the work that they have done in India, or trade that undervalued India's goods and overvalued outside goods. 

British workers in India were encouraged to take on high paying jobs in India, and the British government allowed them to take a portion of their income back to Britain. Furthermore, the East India Company was purchasing Indian goods with money drained from India to export to Britain, which was a way that the opening up of free trade allowed India to be exploited.

When elected to Parliament by a narrow margin of five votes, his first speech was devoted to the issue of questioning Britain's role in India. Naoroji explained that Indians would either be British subjects or their slaves, depending on how willing Britain was to give India control over the institutions that Britain presently operated. By giving these institutions to India it would allow India to govern itself and as a result all revenue would stay in India. 

Naoroji identified himself as a fellow subject of the Empire and was able to address the economic hardships facing India to a British audience. By presenting himself as an imperial subject he was able to use rhetoric to show the benefit to Britain that an ease of financial burden on India would have. He argued that by allowing the money earned in India to stay in India, tributes would be willingly and easily paid without fear of poverty; he argued that this could be done by giving equal employment opportunities to Indian professionals who were consistently forced to take jobs that they were over-qualified for. Indian labour would be more likely to spend their income within India preventing one aspect of the drain.

Naoroji also found it important to examine Anglo-Indian trade to prevent the premature dissolution of budding industries to unfair valuing of goods and services. By allowing industry to grow and develop in India, tribute could be paid to Britain in the form of taxation and the increase in Indian interest for British goods. Over time, Naoroji became more inflammatory in his comments as he began to lose patience with Britain over the seemingly lack of progress regarding reforms. He rhetorically questioned whether or not the British government would be willing to award French youths all the high ranking posts in the British economy. He also pointed to historical examples of Britain being opposed to the "wealth drain" concept, including the English objection to the wealth drain to the papacy during the 1500s. 

Naoroji's work on the drain theory was the main reason behind the creation of the Royal Commission on Indian Expenditure in 1896 in which he was also a member. This commission reviewed financial burdens on India and in some cases came to the conclusion that those burdens were misplaced.

Views and legacy
Dadabhai Naoroji is regarded as one of the most important Indians during the birth of the nascent independence movement. In his writings, he came to the conclusion that the exertion of foreign rule over India was not favourable for the nation, and that independence (or at the very least, responsible government) would be the better path for India.

Naoroji is often remembered as the "Grand Old Man of Indian Nationalism."

Mohandas Karamchand Gandhi wrote to Naoroji in 1894, saying that "The Indians look up to you as children to the father. Such is really the feeling here."

Bal Gangadhar Tilak admired him; he said:

Here are the significant extracts taken from his speech delivered before the East India Association on 2 May 1867 regarding what educated Indians expect from their British rulers.

"In this Memorandum I desire to submit for the kind and generous consideration of His Lordship the Secretary of State for India, that from the same cause of the deplorable drain [of economic wealth from India to Britain], besides the material exhaustion of India, the moral loss to her is no less sad and lamentable . . . All [the Europeans] effectually do is to eat the substance of India, material and moral, while living there, and when they go, they carry away all they have acquired . . . The thousands [of Indians] that are being sent out by the universities every year find themselves in a most anomalous position. There is no place for them in their motherland . . . What must be the inevitable consequence? . . . despotism and destruction . . . or destroying hand and power. "

A plaque referring to Dadabhai Naoroji is located outside the Finsbury Town Hall on Rosebery Avenue, London. On 10 August 2022 English Heritage unveiled a blue plaque in his honour at the site of his former home, 72, Anerley Park, Bromley, London where he lived between 1897 - 1904 or 1905.

Works
 Started the Rast Goftar Anglo-Gujarati Newspaper in 1854.
 The manners and customs of the Parsees (Bombay, 1864)
 The European and Asiatic races (London, 1866)
 Admission of educated natives into the Indian Civil Service (London, 1868)
 The wants and means of India (London, 1876)
 Condition of India (Madras, 1882)
 Poverty of India
 A Paper Read Before the Bombay Branch of the East India Association, Bombay, Ranima Union Press, (1876)
 C. L. Parekh, ed., Essays, Speeches, Addresses and Writings of the Honourable Dadabhai Naoroji, Bombay, Caxton Printing Works (1887). An excerpt, "The Benefits of British Rule", in a modernised text by J. S. Arkenberg, ed., on line at Paul Halsall, ed., Internet Modern History Sourcebook.
 Lord Salisbury's Blackman (Lucknow, 1889)

 ; Commonwealth Publishers, 1988. 

Commemorative postage stamps
Naoroji has been portrayed on commemorative stamps released by India Post (by year) -

See also
Electoral firsts in the United Kingdom

References

Further reading
 
 Vikram Visana, Uncivil Liberalism: Labour, Capital, and Commercial Society in Dadabhai Naoroji's Political Thought, Cambridge University Press (2022).
 Rustom P. Masani, Dadabhai Naoroji (1939).
 Munni Rawal, Dadabhai Naoroji, Prophet of Indian Nationalism, 1855–1900, New Delhi: Anmol Publications (1989).
 S. R. Bakshi, Dadabhai Naoroji: The Grand Old Man, Anmol Publications (1991). 
 Verinder Grover, Dadabhai Naoroji: A Biography of His Vision and Ideas, New Delhi: Deep & Deep Publishers (1998). 
 Debendra Kumar Das, ed., Great Indian Economists : Their Creative Vision for Socio-Economic Development. Vol. I:  Dadabhai Naoroji (1825–1917): Life Sketch and Contribution to Indian Economy. New Delhi: Deep and Deep (2004).  
 P. D. Hajela, Economic Thoughts of Dadabhai Naoroji, New Delhi: Deep & Deep (2001). 
 Pash Nandhra, entry Dadabhai Naoroji in Brack et al. (eds).Dictionary of Liberal History; Politico's, 1998
 Zerbanoo Gifford, Dadabhai Naoroji: Britain's First Asian MP; Mantra Books, 1992
 Codell, J. "Decentering & Doubling Imperial Discourse in the British Press: D. Naoroji & M. M. Bhownaggree", Media History 15 (Fall 2009), 371–84.
 Metcalf and Metcalf, Concise History of India Vikram Visana, "Vernacular Liberalism, Capitalism, and Anti-Imperialism in the Political Thought of Dadabhai Naoroji", The Historical Journal 59, 3 (2016), 775–797. 

External links

 
 "Dr Dadabhai Naoroji, 'The Grand Old Man of India, Vohuman.org – Presents a complete chronology of Naoroji's life.
 
 
 
 B. Shantanu, "Drain of Wealth during British Raj", iVarta.com,'' 6 February 2006.
 

India House
1825 births
1917 deaths
19th-century Indian politicians
Academics of University College London
British people of Parsi descent
British politicians of Indian descent
British Zoroastrians
Businesspeople from Mumbai
Elphinstone College alumni
English people of Parsi descent
Indian emigrants to England
Indian National Congress politicians from Maharashtra
Liberal Party (UK) MPs for English constituencies
Parsi people
Parsi people from Mumbai
Politicians from Mumbai
Presidents of the Indian National Congress
UK MPs 1892–1895
Zoroastrian studies scholars